The women's team competition was a gymnastics event contested as part of the Gymnastics at the 1964 Summer Olympics programme at the Tokyo Metropolitan Gymnasium.

Results
The score for the team was a sum of its 6 members' best scores.  In each of the 4 apparatuses, the top 5 scores in each category (compulsory and optional) were summed, for a total of 8 categories.  400 points were possible.

Sources
 

Gymnastics at the 1964 Summer Olympics
1964 in women's gymnastics
Women's events at the 1964 Summer Olympics